This is a list of the governors of Chubut, Argentina, first as a National Territory, then as a province. The Governor of Chubut is the highest executive officer of the province.

Chubut National Territory

Chubut Province

See also
 Legislature of Chubut

References
 Chubut's governors gallery.

External links
 Official web site.

Chubut
Chubut Province